Structures is a compilation album by English progressive house DJ and producer John Digweed, released on 12 July 2010 by Digweed's own label Bedrock Records.

Track listing

References

External links
Bedrock Records – John Digweed – Structures Interactive

John Digweed albums
Electronic compilation albums
2010 compilation albums
Bedrock Records albums